Physical education, often abbreviated to Phys Ed. or P.E., is a subject taught in schools around the world. It is usually taught during primary and secondary education, and encourages psychomotor learning by using a play and movement exploration setting to promote health and physical fitness. Activities in P.E. include football, netball, hockey, rounders, cricket, four square, racing, and numerous other children's games. Physical education also teaches nutrition, healthy habits, and individuality of needs.

Physical education programs vary all over the world. When taught correctly, P.E. class can produce positive effects on students' health, behavior, and academic performance. As part of this, health education is the teaching of information on the prevention, control, and treatment of diseases. It is taught with physical education, or P.H.E. for short.

Pedagogy

The main goals in teaching modern physical education are:
 To expose children and teens to a wide variety of exercise and healthy activities. Because P.E. can be accessible to nearly all children, it is one of the only opportunities that can guarantee beneficial and healthy activity in children.
 To teach skills to maintain a lifetime of fitness as well as health.
 To encourage self-reporting and monitoring of exercise.
 To individualize duration, intensity, and type of activity.
 To focus feedback on the work, rather than the result.
 To provide active role models.

It is critical for physical educators to foster and strengthen developing motor skills and to provide children and teens with a basic skill set that builds their movement repertoire, which allows students to engage in various forms of games, sports, and other physical activities throughout their lifetime.

These goals can be achieved in a variety of ways. National, state, and local guidelines often dictate which standards must be taught in regards to physical education. These standards determine what content is covered, the qualifications educators must meet, and the textbooks and materials which must be used. These various standards include teaching sports education, or the use of sports as exercise; fitness education, relating to overall health and fitness; and movement education, which deals with movement in a non-sport context.

These approaches and curriculums are based on pioneers in P.E., namely, Francois Delsarte, Liselott Diem, and Rudolf von Laban, who, in the 1800s focused on using a child's ability to use their body for self-expression. This, in combination with approaches in the 1960s, (which featured the use of the body, spatial awareness, effort, and relationships) gave birth to the modern teaching of physical education.

When taught correctly and in a positive manner, children and teens can receive a storm of health benefits. These include reduced metabolic disease risk, cardiological fitness, and better mental health. Research has also shown that there is a positive correlation between brain development and exercising.

Physical education can also help improve academic achievement. Researchers in 2007 found a profound gain in English Arts standardized test scores among students who had 56 hours of physical education in a year, compared to those who had 28 hours of physical education a year.

Recent research has also explored the role of physical education for moral development in support of social inclusion and social justice agendas, where it is under-researched, especially in the context of disability, and the social inclusion of disabled people.

Technology use in physical education 
Many physical education classes utilize technology to assist their pupils in effective exercise. One of the most affordable and popular tools is a simple video recorder. With this, students record themselves, and, upon playback, can see mistakes they are making in activities like throwing or swinging. Studies show that students find this more effective than having someone try to explain what they are doing wrong, and then trying to correct it.

Educators may also use technology such as pedometers and heart rate monitors to make step and heart rate goals for students.

Other technologies that can be used in a physical education setting include video projectors and GPS systems. Gaming systems and their associated games, such as the Kinect, Wii, and Wii Fit can also be used. Projectors are used to show students proper form or how to play certain games. GPS systems can be used to get students active in an outdoor setting, and active exergames can be used by teachers to show students a good way to stay fit in and out of a classroom setting.

By location 
According to the World Health Organization (WHO), it is suggested that young children should be participating in 60 minutes of exercise per day at least 3 times per week in order to maintain a healthy body.

Asia

Philippines  
In the Philippines, P.E. is mandatory for all years in school, unless the school gives the option for a student to do the Leaving Certificate Vocational Programme instead for their fifth and sixth year. Some schools have integrated martial arts training into their physical education curriculum.

Singapore 
A Biennial compulsory fitness exam, NAPFA, is conducted in every school to assess pupils' physical fitness in Singapore. This includes a series of fitness tests. Students are graded by a system of gold, silver, bronze, or as a fail. NAPFA for pre-enlistees serves as an indicator for an additional two months in the country's compulsory national service training if they attain bronze or fail.

Europe

Ireland 
In Ireland, one is expected to do two semesters worth of 80-minute P.E. classes. This also includes showering and changing times. So, on average, classes are composed of 60–65 minutes of activity.

Poland 
In Poland, pupils are expected to do at least three hours of PE a week during primary and secondary education. Universities must also organise at least 60 hours of physical education classes in undergraduate courses.

Sweden 
In Sweden, the time school students spend in P.E. lessons per week varies between municipalities, but generally, years 0 to 2 have 55 minutes of P.E. a week; years 3 to 6 have 110 minutes a week, and years 7 to 9 have 220 minutes. In upper secondary school, all national programs have an obligatory course, containing 100 points of P.E., which corresponds to 90–100 hours of P.E. during the course (one point per hour). Schools can regulate these hours as they like during the three years of school students attend. Most schools have students take part in this course during the first year and offer a follow-up course, which also contains 100 points/hours.

United Kingdom 

In England, pupils in years 7, 8, and 9 are expected to do two hours of exercise per week. Pupils in years 10 and 11 are expected to do one hour of exercise per week.

In Wales, pupils are expected to do two hours of PE a week.

North America

Canada 
In British Columbia, the government has mandated in the grade one curriculum that students must participate in physical activity daily five times a week. The educator is also responsible for planning Daily Physical Activity (DPA), which is thirty minutes of mild to moderate physical activity a day (not including curriculum physical education classes). The curriculum also requires students in grade one to be knowledgeable about healthy living. For example, they must be able to describe the benefits of regular exercise, identify healthy choices in activities, and describe the importance of choosing healthy food. 

Ontario, Canada has a similar procedure in place. On October 6, 2005, the Ontario Ministry of Education (OME)  implemented a DPA policy in elementary schools, for those in grades 1 through 8. The government also requires that all students in grades 1 through 8, including those with special needs, be provided with opportunities to participate in a minimum of twenty minutes of sustained, moderate to vigorous physical activity each school day during instructional time.

United States 
The 2012 "Shape Of The Nation Report" by the National Association for Sport and Physical Education (part of SHAPE America) and the American Heart Association found that while nearly 75% of states require physical education in elementary through high school, over half of the states permit students to substitute other activities for their required physical education credit, or otherwise fail to mandate a specific amount of instructional time. According to the report, only six states (Illinois, Hawaii, Massachusetts, Mississippi, New York, and Vermont) require physical education at every grade level. A majority of states in 2016 did not require a specific amount of instructional time, and more than half allow exemptions or substitution. These loopholes can lead to reduced effectiveness of the physical education programs.

Zero Hour is a before-school physical education class first implemented by Naperville Central High School. In the state of Illinois, this program is known as Learning Readiness P.E. (LRPE). The program was based on research indicating that students who are physically fit are more academically alert, experience growth in brain cells, and enhancement in brain development. NCHS pairs a P.E. class that incorporates cardiovascular exercise, core strength training, cross-lateral movements, as well as literacy and math strategies which enhance learning and improve achievement.

See also
Recreation
Exercise
Lack of physical education
Sports day
Worldwide Day of Play

References

External links
 
 The Sociological Aspects of Physical Education

 
Education
Sports science
Education by subject